Cyphoma is a genus of predatory tropical sea snails, a taxonomic group of marine gastropod molluscs in the family Ovulidae, a family which is sometimes known as the false cowries or cowry allies.

Distribution
Cyphoma snails live in tropical oceans and seas.

Habitat
Species in this genus live on sea whips and sea fans.

Life habits
Cyphoma snails feed by grazing on the sea fans or sea whips which they inhabit.

The males can be territorial, defending part of the sea fan from encroachment by other males.

Species
Species within the genus Cyphoma include:
 Cyphoma arturi Fehse, 2006
 Cyphoma aureocinctum (Dall, 1889) - gold-line cyphoma
 Cyphoma cassidyae Lorenz, 2020
 Cyphoma christahemmenae (Fehse, 1997)
 Cyphoma eludens Lorenz & J. Brown, 2015 
 Cyphoma emarginatum (Sowerby, 1830)
 Cyphoma gibbosum (Linnaeus, 1758) - flamingo tongue snail
 Cyphoma guerrinii Fehse, 2001
 Cyphoma intermedium (Sowerby, 1828)
 Cyphoma mcgintyi Pilsbry, 1939
 Cyphoma rhomba Cate, 1979 - bullroarer cyphoma
 Cyphoma sedlaki Cate, 1979
 Cyphoma signatum Pilsbry & McGinty, 1939
 Cyphoma versicolor Fehse, 2003
Species brought into synonymy
 Cyphoma alleneae Cate, 1973: synonym of Cyphoma gibbosum (Linnaeus, 1758)
 Cyphoma aureocincta (Dall, 1889): synonym of Cyphoma aureocinctum (Dall, 1889)
 Cyphoma dorsatum Röding, 1798: synonym of Cyphoma gibbosum (Linnaeus, 1758)
 Cyphoma elongatum A. Adams, 1854: synonym of Phenacovolva recurva (Sowerby in A. Adams & Reeve, 1848)
 Cyphoma emarginata (Sowerby, 1830): synonym of Cyphoma emarginatum (Sowerby, 1830)
 Cyphoma finkli Petuch, 1979: synonym of Cyphoma signata Pilsbry & McGinty, 1939: synonym of Cyphoma signatum Pilsbry & McGinty, 1939
 Cyphoma gibbosa (Linnaeus, 1758): synonym of Cyphoma gibbosum (Linnaeus, 1758)
 Cyphoma gibsonsmithorum Petuch, 1987: synonym of Cyphoma intermedium (Sowerby, 1828)
 Cyphoma lindae Petuch, 1987: synonym of Cyphoma mcgintyi Pilsbry, 1939
 Cyphoma macumba Petuch, 1979: synonym of Cyphoma gibbosum (Linnaeus, 1758)
 Cyphoma marginata Chenu, 1859: synonym of Cyphoma emarginata (Sowerby, 1830): synonym of Cyphoma emarginatum (Sowerby, 1830)
 Cyphoma precursor Dall, 1897: synonym of Cyphoma gibbosum (Linnaeus, 1758)
 Cyphoma roamoralesi Macsotay & Villarroel, 2001: synonym of Cyphoma christahemmenae (Fehse, 1997)
 Cyphoma robustior Bayer, 1941: synonym of Cyphoma mcgintyi Pilsbry, 1939
 Cyphoma signata Pilsbry & McGinty, 1939: synonym of Cyphoma signatum Pilsbry & McGinty, 1939
 Cyphoma uniplicata (Sowerby, 1849): synonym of Simnialena uniplicata (Sowerby, 1849)
 Cyphoma viaavensis Petuch, 1986: synonym of Cyphoma rhomba Cate, 1978

References

External links 
 
 Röding P.F. (1798). Museum Boltenianum sive Catalogus cimeliorum e tribus regnis naturæ quæ olim collegerat Joa. Fried Bolten, M. D. p. d. per XL. annos proto physicus Hamburgensis. Pars secunda continens Conchylia sive Testacea univalvia, bivalvia & multivalvia. Trapp, Hamburg. viii, 199 pp

Ovulidae
Taxa named by Peter Friedrich Röding